XHNK-FM (99.3 MHz) is a radio station serving Nuevo Laredo, Tamaulipas and Laredo, Texas. XHNK is owned by Grupo AS, an affiliate of Radiorama, and carries the Los 40 format from Radiópolis.

History
XHNK was proposed in 1967 and received its concession in 1973. It was owned by and named for Guillermo Núñez Keith.

XHNK was among the first to broadcast in HD Radio in Mexico and the first in the two Laredos.

Recent formats for XHNK have included classic hits Éxtasis Digital, Los 40 Principales, and Arroba FM (Radiorama's CHR pop format). In 2016, XHNK returned to Los 40.

References

Radio stations in Nuevo Laredo